James Ralph Poole (May 12, 1895 – January 2, 1975) nicknamed "Easy", was an American Major League Baseball infielder.

In a three year major league career spanning 283 games, Poole posted a .288 batting average (271-for-940) with 118 runs, 54 doubles, 13 triples, 13 home runs and 141 RBI. He recorded a .987 fielding percentage as a first baseman.

References

External links

Major League Baseball first basemen
Philadelphia Athletics players
Philadelphia Athletics scouts
Baseball players from North Carolina
1895 births
1975 deaths
People from Taylorsville, North Carolina
Erwin Aces players
Erwin Cubs players
Nashville Vols players
Mooresville Moors players
Morganton Aggies players
Belmont Chiefs players
Newnan Cowetas players